Lepidium oxycarpum is a species of flowering plant in the mustard family known by the common names forked pepperweed and sharp-fruited pepperweed.

Distribution
It is native to California, and it has been reported in British Columbia and one area in Washington. It grows in alkaline and saline soils and moist areas such as vernal pools and coastline.

Description
Lepidium oxycarpum is a short-lived annual herb producing several erect stem branches to heights rarely exceeding 15 centimeters. The leaves are linear in shape, with those at the base up to 6 centimeters long and sometimes with narrow lobes.

The plant blooms in tiny flowers with sepals often less than a millimeter long. The flowers may or may not have white petals also up to a millimeter long.

The fruit is a two-chambered silique capsule, a few millimeters long which is oval or oblong. It has a notch at the tip forming a fork shape.

External links
Jepson Manual Treatment - Lepidium oxycarpum
Washington State Threatened Species Profile
Lepidium oxycarpum - Photo gallery

oxycarpum
Flora of California
Flora of British Columbia
Flora of Washington (state)
Natural history of the California chaparral and woodlands
Natural history of the California Coast Ranges
Natural history of the Central Valley (California)
Natural history of the San Francisco Bay Area
Plants described in 1838
Flora without expected TNC conservation status